Cardis is both a surname and a given name. Notable people with the name include:

Surname
Bertrand Cardis (born 1956), Swiss Olympic sailor
Louis Cardis (1825–1877), American politician
Romain Cardis (born 1992), French cyclist

Given name
Cardis Cardell Willis (1937–2007), American comedian